John R. Williams (1782–1854) was an American politician who served as mayor of Detroit.

John R. Williams may also refer to:

 John Ralston Williams (1874–1965), Canadian-American physician
 John Reesor Williams (born 1930), Canadian politician
 John Reginald Williams (born 1955), Australian politician
 John Richard Williams (poet) (1867–1924), Welsh poet
 John Richard Williams (politician) or Jack Williams (1909–1998), American politician and radio announcer who served as Governor of Arizona
 John Richard Williams (priest) (born 1948), Anglican priest
 John Robert Williams (footballer) or Johnny Williams (1947–2021), English footballer

See also 
 John Williams (disambiguation)
 John Richard Williams (disambiguation)